Lost in the Stars is a 1949 musical based on the 1948 novel Cry, the Beloved Country.

Lost in the Stars may refer to:

 Cry, the Beloved Country, 1948 novel also released as "Lost in the Stars"
 "Lost in the Stars" (song), from the eponymous musical, 1949
 Lost in the Stars (film), a 1974 film based on the 1949 musical
 Lost in the Stars: The Music of Kurt Weill, a 1985 tribute album
 Lost in the Stars: Live at 54 Below, a 2015 album by Annaleigh Ashford

See also

 
 Lost Star (disambiguation)
 Lost in Space (disambiguation)